Air Marshal Arti Sarin, VSM is a serving air officer in the Indian Air Force. She currently serves as the Director General Medical Services (Air). She picked up the rank of Air Marshal after holding the rank of Surgeon Vice Admiral in the Indian Navy. She previously served as the Director and Commandant of the Armed Forces Medical College. She is the sixth woman in the Indian Armed Forces to be promoted to a three-star rank. She is the third woman officer to hold the rank of Vice Admiral in the Indian Navy, after Surgeon Vice Admirals Punita Arora and Sheila S. Mathai.

Sarin has the rare distinction of serving in all three branches of the Indian Armed Forces. She served in the Indian Army from the ranks of Lieutenant to Captain, in the Indian Navy from Surgeon Lieutenant to Surgeon Vice Admiral and in the Indian Air Force as an Air Marshal.

Early life and education
Sarin was born into a naval family. Her father was a naval officer who served for 41 years. Her brother Rajesh also served in the navy for 30 years. A submariner, Rajesh retired a Commodore, having served as the Commodore Commanding Submarines (East) besides commanding three submarines and a frigate. Her sister-in-law, Rajesh's wife, was also a doctor in the navy.

Sarin attended the Timpany School, Viskhapatnam. She then joined the Armed Forces Medical College, Pune (AFMC). At AFMC, she completed her MBBS.

Military career
Sarin was commissioned in the Armed Forces Medical Services on 26 December 1985. She did her post-graduation in 1992, earning the Doctor of Medicine degree in Radiology from AFMC. She then earned a DNB degree in Radiation Oncology from the Tata Memorial Centre, Mumbai. She was trained in Gamma Knife Surgery at the University of Pittsburgh in Pennsylvania.

Sarin has served at the Naval Science and Technological Laboratory (NTSL), a defence laboratory of the Defence Research and Development Organisation (DRDO) in Visakhapatnam. She has also served at the Naval Hospitals INHS Dhanvantari at Port Blair, INHS Kalyani at Visakhapatnam, INHS Sanjivani at Kochi and INHS Asvini at Mumbai.

Sarin is an examiner for the National Board of Examinations in Radiotherapy and the Maharashtra University of Health Sciences (MUHS), Nashik. She has also been a recognised post-graduate degree teacher at the Mumbai University, Pune University and at the MUHS for MD Radiology & DNB Radiation Oncology. She has several publications in Indian and International Journals and has contributed to chapters in books of Liver disease and assisted Reproduction respectively.

Sarin has served as a Professor & Head of the Department (HOD) Radiation Oncology at  Army Hospital (Research & Referral) in Delhi, the Command Hospital Southern Command, Pune, the AFMC and INHS Asvini. In her administrative appointments, she has served as the Senior Registrar (Medical Superintendent) at INHS Asvini and as the Principal Medical Officer Naval Dockyard (Mumbai). During the COVID-19 pandemic, as a Surgeon Commodore, Sarin oversaw the design and development of innovative solutions and set up quarantine facilities in Southern Naval Command.

Flag rank

On 22 June 2020, Sarin was promoted to the rank of Rear Admiral and appointed Command Medical Officer, Southern Naval Command (SNC). She is the first and only woman to have held the appointment of CMO at SNC. On 26 January 2021, she was awarded the Vishisht Seva Medal for distinguished service of a high order. After a short stint at SNC, she was appointed Commanding Officer of INHS Asvini. On 31 January 2021, in a rare event of a change of command between two women flag officers, she took over from Surgeon Rear Admiral Sheila S. Mathai.

In December 2021, Sarin relinquished charge as CO INHS Asvini and was appointed Command Medical Officer Western Naval Command.

On 5 October 2022, she was promoted to the rank of Surgeon Vice Admiral, only the sixth woman to be promoted to three-star rank in the Indian Armed Forces. She was appointed the Director and Commandant of the Armed Forces Medical College. She took over from another woman three-star officer - Lieutenant General Rajshree Ramasethu. On 10 January 2023, Sarin took over as the Director General Medical Services (Air) (DGMS Air) in the rank of Air Marshal.

Personal life
Sarin is married to a retired officer of the Indian Navy, Surgeon Rear Admiral C. S. Naidu, AVSM, VSM, a hepatobiliary surgeon who served in the navy for 36 years. In 2020, in a first, the couple served as the Command Medical Officers (CMO) of naval commands. While Sarin served as the CMO of the Southern Naval Command, Naidu was the CMO of the Eastern Naval Command. The couple has a son, Rohan.

Awards and decorations
Sarin has been awarded the Chief of the Naval Staff Commendation Card in 2001, the General Officer Commanding-in-Chief commendation in 2013, the Chief of the Army Staff commendation in 2017 and the Vishisht Seva Medal in 2021.

See also
 Women in the Indian Armed Forces
 Punita Arora
 Padma Bandopadhyay
 Madhuri Kanitkar
 Sheila S. Mathai
 Rajshree Ramasethu

References

Indian Navy personnel
Indian Navy admirals
Female admirals of the Indian Navy
Living people
Women in 21st-century warfare
Women in warfare post-1945
Indian female military personnel
Year of birth missing (living people)
Recipients of the Vishisht Seva Medal